is a historic Japanese temple complex with many temples and statues on Mount Misen, the holy mountain on the island of Itsukushima, off the coast of Hatsukaichi, Hiroshima, Japan. It is the 14th temple in the Chūgoku 33 Kannon Pilgrimage and famous for the maple trees and their autumn colors. It is also called . Including Mt. Misen, Daishō-in is within the World Heritage Area of Itsukushima Shrine.

In this temple there is a flame which is said to have been burning since its foundation, for more than 1200 years.

History
Kūkai was one of the most famous monks in Japan and the founder of Shingon Buddhism. 
Made head temple of one of denomination of Shingon Buddhism and the oldest temple on Itsukushima.
By an Imperial order of Emperor Toba, it was the place to pray for the peace and security of the nation.
Emperor Meiji stayed there on July 31, 1885, for his visit to Itsukushima Shrine.
Repair work for the trail to Mt. Misen was finished in 1905.
It was done by the donation of Itō Hirobumi.
Heavy damage by 19th typhoon on September 27, 1991.
Held a memorial service to congratulate the restoration of the damage on October 10, 1998.
The 14th Dalai Lama visited Itsukushima to celebrate the 1200th-year of Daishō-in from 3 to 8 November 2006.
There are also many buildings, gates of the temple and many statues of Kannon, Jūichimen Kannon, Fudō-myōō (Acala) and Seven Lucky Gods on and around Mt. Misen.

The temple was the administrator of the Itsukushima shrine before Meiji Restoration forbade (Shinbutsu bunri) syncretism (Shinbutsu-shūgō) between Shinto and Buddhism in 1868.

Events

See also 
Itsukushima
Kūkai
Shingon Buddhism
Kannon
Chūgoku 33 Kannon Pilgrimage
Mt. Misen
Acala
Seven Lucky Gods
 Glossary of Japanese Buddhism

References

External links 

Daisyō-in(in Japanese)
Daisho-in page on the Miyajima Official Tourism Website

Buddhist temples in Hiroshima Prefecture
Religious buildings and structures completed in 806
9th-century establishments in Japan